The Spokesperson for the United States Department of State is a U.S. government official whose primary responsibility is to serve as the spokesperson for the United States Department of State and the U.S. government's foreign policies. The position is located in the Bureau of Global Public Affairs.

Historically, the State Department Spokesperson and the Assistant Secretary of State for Public Affairs were synonymous names for the same role. However, this has not been the case since Philip J. Crowley's tenure ended in 2011. Since 2011, the Assistant Secretary and the State Department Spokesperson have been two separate roles held by different people. In late 2015, the two roles were once again merged with the appointment of Spokesperson John Kirby as Assistant Secretary for Public Affairs.

Responsibilities
The State Department spokesperson is responsible for communicating the foreign policy of the United States to American and foreign media, typically in a daily press briefing. The daily press briefing typically includes a summary of the secretary of state's schedule, any upcoming trips by the secretary, the president of the United States, or other distinguished State Department officials including under secretaries and assistant secretaries, and official reactions and positions of the U.S. government on certain news of the day, followed by Q&A with journalists attending the briefing. A tradition that began during the tenure of John Foster Dulles as secretary of state in the 1950s, the daily press briefing is on-the-record, and is recorded and made available on the State Department's website.

The State Department spokesperson will also often accompany the secretary of state on travel to assist with press conferences.

List of State Department spokespeople

References

External links
 Daily Press Briefings at the U.S. State Department

United States Department of State
 
 
Bureau of Public Affairs